Dunnell may refer to:

People
 Francis Dunnell (1868–1960), English solicitor and civil servant
 Karen Dunnell (born 1946), British medical sociologist and civil servant
 Mark H. Dunnell (1823–1904), American politician
 Milt Dunnell (1905–2008), Canadian sportswriter
 Robert Dunnell (1942–2010), American theoretical archaeologist

Places
 Dunnell, Minnesota, United States